Line 12 of the Guangzhou Metro is a fully automated rapid transit line under construction in Guangzhou, China. It was originally planned to open for operation in 2023, but due to the obstruction of the construction progress, it was announced in 2022 that it was expected to be completed in 2024.

History
Construction officially began in November 2018.

Stations (north to south)

Rolling stock
Line 12 will use GoA4 fully automated, 6-car type A trains with a maximum speed of 80 km/h.

References

12